Arthrobacter psychrochitiniphilus is a psychrotrophic bacterium species from the genus Arthrobacter which has been isolated from Adélie penguins in Antarctica.

References

Further reading

External links
Type strain of Arthrobacter psychrochitiniphilus at BacDive -  the Bacterial Diversity Metadatabase

Bacteria described in 2009
Psychrophiles
Micrococcaceae